The Anglo-Indian Wars were the several wars fought in the Indian Subcontinent, over a period of time, between the British East India Company and different Indian states, mainly the Mughal empire, kingdom of Mysore, Nawabs of Bengal, Maratha empire, Sikh empire of Punjab, kingdom of Sindh and others. These wars led to the establishment of British colonial rule in India.

List of wars
The list excludes single sieges and major battles:

 Anglo-Mughal War (1686–1690)
 First Carnatic War (1746–1748)
 Second Carnatic War (1749–1754) 
 Third Carnatic War (1756–1763) 
 Bengal War (1756–1765)
 First Anglo-Mysore War (1767–1769)
 Sannyasi Rebellion (1770–1777)
 First Anglo-Maratha War (1775–1782)
 Second Anglo-Mysore War (1780–1784)
 Bihar Revolt (1781)
 Third Anglo-Mysore War (1790–1792)
 Fourth Anglo-Mysore War (1798–99)
 Second Anglo-Maratha War (1803–1806)
 Vellore Mutiny (1806)
 Anglo-Nepalese War (1814–1816)
 Paika Rebellion (1817)
 Third Anglo-Maratha War (1817–1818)
 Barrackpore mutiny of 1824
 First Anglo-Burmese War (1824–1826)
 First Anglo-Afghan War (1839–1842)
 First Anglo-Marri War (1840)
 Gwalior campaign (1843)
 British conquest of Sindh (1843)
 First Anglo-Sikh War (1845–1846)
 Second Anglo-Sikh War (1848–1849) 
 Second Anglo-Burmese War (1852–1853)
 Indian Rebellion of 1857 (1857–1858)
 Second Anglo-Afghan War (1878–1880)
 Second Anglo-Marri War (1880)
 Third Anglo-Burmese War (1885)
 Anglo Manipur War (1891) 
 Tirah campaign (1897–1898)
 Third Anglo-Marri War (1917)
 Third Anglo-Afghan War (1919)
 Waziristan campaign (1919–1920) 
 Waziristan campaign (1921–1924)
 Pink's War (1925)
 Waziristan campaign (1936–1939)
 Japanese raiders in the Indian Ocean 
 Japanese occupation of the Andaman and Nicobar Islands (1942)
 Indian Ocean raid (1942)
 Indian Ocean raid (1944)
 Burma campaign (1944)
 Operation U-Go (1944)
 Battle of Imphal (1944)
 Battle of Kohima (1944)
 Battle of the Admin Box (1944)
 Battle of Pokoku and Irrawaddy River operations (1945) 
 Battle of Central Burma (1945)
 Royal Indian Navy Mutiny (1946)

See also
 Indian War (disambiguation)
 List of wars involving India
 Afghan–Sikh Wars
 Mughal–Maratha Wars
 Mughal-Rajput Wars
 Ahom–Mughal conflicts
 Chola–Chalukya wars
 Ancient Hindu wars
 List of battles of Rajasthan
 Battles involving the Maratha Empire
 List of battles involving the Sikh Empire
 List of battles between Mughals and Sikhs
 Military history of the North-West Frontier
 Rajput resistance to Muslim conquests
 List of early Hindu–Muslim military conflicts in the Indian subcontinent

Anglo-Indian Wars